Damascones are a series of closely related chemical compounds that are components of a variety of essential oils.  The damascones belong to a family of chemicals known as rose ketones, which also includes damascenones and ionones.  beta-Damascone is a contributor to the aroma of roses, despite its relatively low concentration, and is an important fragrance chemical used in perfumery.

The damascones are derived from the degradation of carotenoids.

See also 
 Rose oil

References

Further reading 

Carotenoids
Enones
Perfume ingredients
Cyclohexenes
B